Hydromorphus concolor, also known as the Costa Rica water snake, is a snake of the colubrid family. It is found in Guatemala, Honduras, Nicaragua, Costa Rica, Panama, and Colombia.

References

Hydromorphus
Snakes of North America
Snakes of South America
Reptiles of Guatemala
Reptiles of Honduras
Reptiles of Nicaragua
Reptiles of Costa Rica
Reptiles of Panama
Reptiles of Colombia
Taxa named by Wilhelm Peters
Reptiles described in 1859